The ASCAP Vanguard Award is an annual award presented by the American Society of Composers, Authors and Publishers (ASCAP), in recognition of "the impact of new and developing musical genres, which help shape the future of music. The award was first presented to Soul Asylum and Björk in 1996. The honor was not presented in 2012, and years with more than one recipient include 1996, 1997, 1998, 2007, 2008, 2010, 2011, and 2013. It is awarded at each of their ceremonies: pop, country, Latin, and rhythm & soul music.

Recipients
2020 - Besu-Fikad Simmei
2019 - Billie Eilish, Finneas, Draco Rosa
2018 - Visitante
2017 - Meghan Trainor, Vico C, Dua Lipa
2016 - Walk the Moon, Chris Stapleton, Jess Glynne, MNEK
2015 - St. Vincent
2014 - Fun, Dan Smith
2013 - Kendrick Lamar,  Diplo
2012 - not presented
2011 - Third Day, The Civil Wars, Band of Horses
2010 - Taio Cruz, Janelle Monáe, The Killers
2009 - Santigold
2008 - Kate Nash, Black Guayaba, Sara Bareilles 
2007 - Bat for Lashes, The All-American Rejects
2006 - Joseph Arthur
2005 - Arcade Fire
2004 - The Mars Volta
2003 - Jack Johnson
2002 - The Strokes
2001 - Modest Mouse
2000 - Built to Spill
1999 - Beastie Boys
1998 - Nine Inch Nails, The Mighty Mighty Bosstones 
1997 - Beck, The Presidents of the United States of America
1996 - Soul Asylum, Björk

References

External links
 American Society of Composers, Authors and Publishers' official site
 ASCAP Foundation

American music awards
Awards established in 1996
Vanguard Award